The Saint-Mathieu Lighthouse is a lighthouse located on Pointe Saint-Mathieu in Plougonvelin, around Brest in Finistère. The lighthouse is open to the public.

Saint-Mathieu was built in 1835 among the ruins of the ancient Abbaye Saint-Mathieu de Fine-Terre. It is a major lighthouse of the French coast, with a theoretical range of 29 nautical miles (around 55 km).

Saint-Mathieu's alignment with the Portzic Lighthouse also indicates the route for entrance to the Goulet de Brest.

It was classified as a monument historique on 23 May 2011.

History 

The promontory of Saint-Mathieu hosts the ruins of an abbey, a sémaphore, and a lighthouse. This bizarre juxtaposition (some suggestions were made to restore the abbey, while deconstructing the lighthouse and rebuilding it elsewhere) is explained by the connections these structures shared throughout Saint-Mathieu's history.

First lighthouse 

There had long been a light signal for navigating ships before the Saint-Mathieu Lighthouse. The end of the 17th century, however, brought with it a need for accessibility to a new naval base in Brest and the necessity of more serious methods of navigation for western Brittany.

On 19 November 1691, the construction of a light in the tower of the abbey was proposed, and completed in September 1692.

However, the cost of ignition was expensive, and the light of Saint-Mathieu was thus only lit on particularly dark nights in the autumn and winter. The use of coal fire additionally presented a risk of setting the abbey ablaze.

In December 1695, the previous light was replaced by a glass lantern, containing five copper lanterns placed on three stacked rows. This brought with it the problem of the light being redirected upward when oil levels fell low, and the problem of clouding the glass with vapors due to the burning of unpurified fish oil.

French naval commander Anne Hilarion de Tourville complained that the lighthouse was not regularly lit. Monks of the abbey offered their services in exchange for a droit de bris (a right to the goods from ships wrecked on one's property), and were charged with illuminating the light from 1 January 1694. The French Navy took charge of the lighthouse in 1701, and rented a house with the purpose of installing a guard.

In March 1750, a gale destroyed the lantern, and a steward of the Navy strengthened the building with a metal frame. At the time, the light could be seen from a distance of two leagues. However, a fence had to be installed to prevent seabirds from crashing into the windowpanes, and this absorbed a great deal of the light.

In 1771, Lieutenant-general Charles Henri Hector made a series of changes. The small windowpanes were replaced by large Bohemian glass, and the lamps were replaced with double wick ones, utilizing a mixture of fish and rapeseed oil.

The lighthouse was spared during the sale of national assets. Thus, the ruins and the tower, despite the valuable reserve of stones they could afford, were not to be demolished.

In 1820, the light of Saint-Mathieu was equipped with a device for turning light with eight Lenoir reflectors and Argand lamps, which increased its range. There was still, however, the problem of insufficient height.

Current lighthouse 
The state of the tower of the ancient abbey was deteriorating, and a new lighthouse was put in service on 15 June 1835. The light used canola oil, until being electrified in 1932.

On 10 October 1911, the fire was put in a mercury bath and changed its characteristic, having since been a flashing light every 15 seconds. It assumed its present appearance in June 1963: a white-painted tower marked "SAINT-MATHIEU" in red, with a red stripe at the top.

Media 
The Saint-Mathieu Lighthouse served as the backdrop for reports from the 2012–2013 season of the show Thalassa, on France 3.

Gallery

See also 

 List of lighthouses in France

References

Bibliography

External links 

 

Lighthouses completed in 1835
Lighthouses in Brittany
Monuments historiques of Finistère